Color Rit is an album by American jazz guitarist Lee Ritenour that was released in 1989 by GRP Records. The album reached No. 4 on the Billboard magazine Contemporary Jazz chart.

Track listing

Personnel
 Lee Ritenour – Guitar
 Jerry Hey – Trumpet
 Ernie Watts – Saxophone
 Russell Ferrante – Keyboards
 Dave Witham – Keyboards
 Larry Williams – Keyboards
 Oscar Castro-Neves – Guitar
 Jimmy Johnson – Bass
 Carlos Vega – Drums
 Paulinho da Costa – Percussion
 Phil Perry – Vocals
 Gonzaguinha - Vocals
 Gracinha Leporace - Vocals
 Kate Markowitz - Vocals
 Anthony Jackson - Contra Bass Guitar
 Bob Wilson – Drums

Track information and credits adapted from Discogs and AllMusic, then verified from the album's liner notes.

Charts

References

External links
Lee Ritenour - Color Rit at Discogs
Lee Ritenour's Official Site

1989 albums
GRP Records albums
Lee Ritenour albums